This is a list of all cricketers who have captained the Papua New Guinea in an official international match. This includes One Day Internationals, Twenty20 Internationals and ICC Trophy games. The table is correct as of their last ODI game which was played on September 23, 2019.

One Day International

Papua New Guinea played their first ODI on November 8, 2014.

{| class="wikitable" width="70%"
! bgcolor="#efefef" colspan=9 | PNG ODI Captains
|- bgcolor="#efefef"
! No.
! Name
! Year
! Played
! Won
! Lost
! Tied
! N/R
|-
|| 1 || Chris Amini || 2014–2014 || 2 || 2 || 0 || 0 || 0
|-
|| 2 || Assad Vala || 2016–2022 || 43 || 8 || 35 || 0 || 0
|-
|| 3 || Kiplin Doriga || 2023 || 1 || 0 || 1 || 0 || 0

Twenty20 International

PNG played their first T20 on July 15, 2015.

References

External links
Cricinfo

PNG